The 3 arrondissements of the Loire department are:

 Arrondissement of Montbrison, (subprefecture: Montbrison) with 135 communes. The population of the arrondissement was 181,551 in 2016.  
 Arrondissement of Roanne, (subprefecture: Roanne) with 113 communes. The population of the arrondissement was 157,160 in 2016.  
 Arrondissement of Saint-Étienne, (prefecture of the Loire department: Saint-Étienne) with 75 communes. The population of the arrondissement was 423,286 in 2016.

History

In 1800 the arrondissements of Montbrison, Roanne and Saint-Étienne were established. All of them is never disbanded. In January 2017 the commune Andrézieux-Bouthéon passed from the arrondissements of Montbrison to the arrondissement of Saint-Étienne.

References

Loire